The 1988 Lafayette Leopards football team was an American football team that represented Lafayette College during the 1988 NCAA Division I-AA football season. The Leopards swept the Colonial League to win the conference championship. 

In their eighth year under head coach Bill Russo, the Leopards compiled a 8–2–1 record. Chris LaPietra and Andy Nygren were the team captains.

The Leopards outscored opponents 420 to 251. Their undefeated (5–0) conference record placed first in the six-team Colonial League standings.

Unranked in the preseason poll, Lafayette soon climbed the ranks during a five-game winning streak, reaching as high as No. 5 in the weekly national Division I-AA rankings. Non-conference losses in the middle of the year led to the team dropping out of the top 20, and it finished the season unranked.

Lafayette played its home games at Fisher Field on College Hill in Easton, Pennsylvania.

Schedule

References

Lafayette
Lafayette Leopards football seasons
Patriot League football champion seasons
Lafayette Leopards football